Jon Bernthal is an American actor. The following are his roles in film, television series, video games and theater.

Film

Television

Video games

Theater

References

External links 
 

American filmographies
Male actor filmographies